American Armed Forces Mutual Aid Association (AAFMAA) is a Virginia-based not-for-profit, tax-exempt, Member-owned association that provides diversified financial services, including life insurance, investing and trust services, mortgage services, and survivor services to the U.S. Armed Forces communities.  At the end of 2019, Membership exceeded 85,000

AAFMAA was founded in 1879 by a group of Army officers in response to the 1876 Battle of the Little Bighorn to provide financial assistance to the families of deceased soldiers. AAFMAA has since expanded to offer wealth management, trust, and mortgage services to past and present members of the Armed Forces.

History 
AAFMAA was established on January 13, 1879, in response to the 1876 Battle of the Little Bighorn to provide financial assistance to the families of deceased soldiers. The founding documents of the association were prepared by a committee of Army Officers chaired by Brigadier General Roger Jones.

The association was originally called the Army Mutual Aid Association and Membership was only open to members of the Army. In 1984, Membership expanded to include Air Force officers and the name was changed to Army and Air Force Mutual Aid Association (AAFMAA) in 1987. In 1995, Membership expanded to include non-commissioned Officers and, in 2000, Membership expanded again to include enlisted ranks. In September 2011, Membership expanded to include service members of the Marine Corps, Navy and Coast Guard. As of 2020, Membership includes all members of the United States Armed Forces who are on active duty, retired, guard, reserves, students of the service academies, ROTC cadets, and honorably discharged veterans. To reflect the expansion in Membership, the association's name was changed to American Armed Forces Mutual Aid Association on June 12, 2013.

AAFMAA is headquartered at Fort Myer, Virginia with additional offices in Reston, Virginia; Fayetteville, North Carolina; and Morrisville, North Carolina.

In 2009, AAFMAA formed AAFMAA Member and Survivor Benefits LLC. As of July 2010, AAFMAA Member and Survivor Benefits provide AAFMAA's grandfathered Members and the surviving widows and widowers of deceased AAFMAA Members with education and assistance of government and military benefits.

In 2012, AAFMAA formed AAFMAA Wealth Management & Trust LLC (AWM&T) to provide financial planning, investment management, and trust services to Members. AAFMAA Wealth Management & Trust LLC is a North Carolina chartered trust company headquartered in Fayetteville, North Carolina with a branch office in Reston, Virginia.

In 2016, AAFMAA formed AAFMAA Mortgages Services LLC (AMS) to provide mortgage products to Members. AMS has locations and/or local Military Mortgage Advisors in Morrisville, North Carolina; Fayetteville, North Carolina; Wilmington, North Carolina; Tempe, Arizona; Denver, Colorado; Dallas, Texas; Reston, Virginia; and Virginia Beach, Virginia to provide assistance and services to Members.

Lines of business 

Life Insurance: AAFMAA's offerings include whole life and term insurance. AAFMAA policies do not include a war clause, terrorist clauses, or aviation clauses or exclusions. In 2019, AAFMAA had over 121,000 policies in force and $25.1 billion insurance in force.

Living Services: Living services include document storage in AAFMAA's digital and physical vaults, personal affairs planning information, including estimates of Social Security, survivor benefits, insurance coverage, and projected college costs, insurance counseling, pre-retirement/separation from service briefings, representation with the Veterans Administration (VA) for claims.

Survivor Assistance Services: Survivor Assistance Services are included with every Membership, including payment of AAFMAA death benefit, VA claims initiation, VA claims representation, lifetime individualized benefit notification, Social Security notification, Financial Awareness Service and an annual statement of spouse entitlements.

Wealth Management and Trust Services: AAFMAA Wealth Management & Trust LLC (AWM&T) provides financial planning, investment management, and trust services to Members. In 2019, AWM&T had $74 million Member assets under management.

AWM&T has offices in Fayetteville, North Carolina and Reston, Virginia and representatives located throughout the country, often near military bases, to provide assistance and services to Members.

Financial planning services include assessment of Member net worth, cash flow, insurance, education funding, retirement planning, and estate planning. Investment management includes asset allocation, investments monitoring, portfolio repositioning and takes into account risk tolerance, investment restrictions, and investment objectives. An Investment Policy Statement (IPS) is developed for each Member at the beginning of the relationship.

Trust services include estate planning support and complete trust services, including acceptance of assignment as trustee, and trust asset management and administration. AWM&T can act as a trustee with most trust types, including revocable living, irrevocable, charitable remainder, charitable lead, testamentary, special needs, irrevocable life insurance, court-appointed, and foundations.

Mortgage Services: AAFMAA Mortgage Services LLC (AMS) provides Members with mortgage loans to build, buy or refinance a home. This includes VA loans, FHA, USDA, a proprietary Construction Advantage loan, VA Cash Out Refinance, VA Interest Rate Reduction Refinancing Loan (IRRRL), and VA High Balance Loans. In 2020, AMS originated $233 million of residential mortgages.

AMS has locations and/or local Military Mortgage Advisors in Morrisville, North Carolina; Fayetteville, North Carolina; Wilmington, North Carolina; Tempe, Arizona; Denver, Colorado; Dallas, Texas; Reston, Virginia; and Virginia Beach, Virginia to provide assistance and services to Members.

AMS is a VA-approved mortgage lender and an Equal Housing Lender.

Honorable board members and chairmen 
Jack Neil Merritt was a retired U.S. Army four-star general who has served on the board of directors for AAFMAA since 2000 and is currently the Vice Chairman of the Board and Chairman of the Finance Committee.
Robert W. Sennewald is a retired U.S. Army four-star general who served as chairman of the board for AAFMAA from 2000 to 2006.
Clyde D. Eddleman was a United States Army four-star general who served as chairman of the board for AAFMAA from 1962 to 1982.
John R. Guthrie was a United States Army four-star general who served on the board of directors for AAFMAA.
Walter T. Kerwin, Jr. was a United States Army four-star general and served as a member of the board of directors for AAFMAA from 1969, becoming its chairman in 1982 and serving until 1997.
Michael S. Davison was a United States Army four-star general and served as the vice chairman for AAFMAA from 1982 to 1997 and chairman from 1997 to 2000.

See also 
 Navy Mutual Aid Association, similar organization for the U.S. Navy, Marines, and Coast Guard

References

External links 
 AAFMAA Homepage.com

Financial services companies established in 1879
Life insurance companies of the United States
Life insurance companies
Insurance companies of the United States
Companies based in Reston, Virginia
Companies based in Virginia